The 2013 Rugby World Cup Sevens was the sixth edition of the Rugby World Cup Sevens. The tournament was held at Luzhniki Stadium in Moscow, Russia. 
New Zealand  won the tournament, defeating England 33–0 in the final. Attendance for the tournament was poor, with matches played in mostly empty stadiums. 

World Rugby, then known as the International Rugby Board (IRB), initially stated that the Rugby World Cup Sevens would be scrapped if rugby sevens were to be included in the Olympic programme for the 2016 Summer Olympics. As the International Olympic Committee voted for the sport's inclusion, this was thought likely to be the last edition of the tournament. However, the IRB clarified that in June 2013, the tournament would be retained and held quadrennially from 2018.

Hosting
In December 2009, the IRB confirmed that the governing rugby boards of Brazil (Brazilian Rugby Association), Germany (German Rugby Federation) and Russia (Rugby Union of Russia) formally expressed their intention to tender to host the tournament. Scottish Rugby Union, the governing rugby board of Scotland, which did not choose to express interest, was also previously considering bidding for the tournament.

In February 2010, the IRB reported that Rugby Union of Russia had formally submitted its tender for the right to host Rugby World Cup Sevens 2013, while the Brazilian and German rugby boards had confirmed their withdrawal from the bidding process. This announcement left Russia as the only country bidding to host the event.

"This tender submission underlines our continued commitment to ignite a new Rugby frontier in Russia through a strategic vision of promotion, participation and growth."

—Vyacheslav Kopiev, President of Rugby Union of Russia

Six days before hosting the 2010 IRB Junior World Rugby Trophy, Russia was officially named as host at the IRB annual congress on 12 May 2010.

Qualification

* Winner of Oceania qualifier will compete in Asian qualifier.

Notes (Men's):
 Canada and United States qualified for the tournament taking the 2 available places in the North America/Caribbean category.
 Zimbabwe and Tunisia qualified for the tournament taking the 2 available places in the Africa category.
 Australia and Tonga qualified for the tournament taking the 2 available places in the Oceania category.
 Portugal, Spain, France, Georgia and Scotland qualified for the tournament taking the 5 available places in the Europe category.
 Japan, Hong Kong and Philippines qualified for the tournament taking the 3 available places in the Asia category.
 Uruguay qualified for the tournament taking the 1 and only place available in the South America category.

Notes (Women's):
 Canada qualified for the tournament through NACRA's regional qualifying tournament taking the 1 and only place available in the North America/Caribbean category.
 Tunisia qualified for the tournament taking the 1 available place in the Africa category.
 England, Ireland, Spain, France and Netherlands qualified for the tournament taking the 5 available places in the European category.
 Fiji, Japan, and China qualified for the tournament through AFRU's regional qualifying tournament taking the 3 available places in the Asian and Oceania category.
 Brazil qualified through CONSUR's regional qualifying tournament taking the 1 and only place in the South America category.

Qualified teams
Men

Women

Men

Women

Trophy Overview

References

External links
Official website

 
Rugby World Cup Sevens
World Cup Sevens
World Cup Sevens
World
2013 Rugby World Cup Sevens
2013 in Moscow